Philippe Dintrans (born 29 January 1957, in Tarbes) is a former French rugby union player and a current entrepreneur. He played as a hooker.

He played all his career at Tarbes Pyrénées Rugby, starting at 1967, aged 10 years old, and joining the first team in 1975/76, aged 18 years old, when he had his debut for the French Championship. He would play at Tarbes until 1991/92, for 17 seasons, with his best result being runners-up to the 1987/88 season, lost to SU Agen.

He had 50 caps for France, from 1979 to 1990, scoring 3 tries, 12 points on aggregate. He played in seven Five Nations Championship editions, in 1980, 1981, 1982, 1983, 1984, 1985 and 1989, winning it in 1981, with a Grand Slam, and in 1989. He played 24 games at the competition, scoring 1 try, 4 points on aggregate. He was called for the 1987 Rugby World Cup, playing in a single game, where he was the captain and remaining scoreless.

He was a Physical Education teacher for seven years and also has been involved in the gastronomical and automobile businesses.

References

External links

1957 births
Living people
Sportspeople from Tarbes
French rugby union players
France international rugby union players
Rugby union hookers
Tarbes Pyrénées Rugby players